Andoa may refer to:
 Andoa language, an extinct Zaparoan language of Peru
 Andoa (plant), a genus of moss in the family Hypnaceae